Dawn Freshwater  is a British academic, university professor, mental health researcher, and the incumbent Vice-Chancellor of the University of Auckland.

Early life and education 
Freshwater was born in a mining family in Nottingham, with two younger brothers. She left school at the age of 15 because her parents became unwell. Freshwater trained as a nurse and was the first member of her family to attend university. Her doctoral research investigated the impact of transformative learning on nursing students for which she awarded a PhD by the University of Nottingham in 1998.

Research and career 
In 2006 Freshwater joined the University of Leeds. Her research concentrated on forensic psychology, and studied the impact of marginalised groups with severe mental health issues.

Freshwater was appointed the Pro-Vice Chancellor (PVC) at the University of Leeds in 2011. She led the School of Medicine application for an Athena SWAN award and served a member of the assessment panel for the Research Excellence Framework (REF). During this time, she served on the Council of Deans for Nursing and Midwifery and was a trustee of the Florence Nightingale Foundation.

In 2014 Freshwater moved to Australia. Freshwater joined the University of Western Australia as Senior Deputy Vice Chancellor in 2016. In 2017 she was made the Vice Chancellor, and led the first Inclusion and Division strategy. She was the first woman to be made Chair of the Group of Eight in 2018. She also led the Matariki network of universities. At the University of Western Australia Freshwater established the Public Policy Institute, which translates research into real-world solutions for the Indo-Pacific region.

In 2019 Freshwater became the first woman to be appointed Vice Chancellor of the University of Auckland.

Publications 
She has authored and co-authored numerous publications including:
 Critical reflection for nursing and the helping professions : a user's guide
Therapeutic Nursing
Emotions And Needs (Core Concepts in Therapy)
Blackwell's Nursing Dictionary
Counselling Skills For Nurses, Midwives and Health Visitor
International Textbook of Reflective Practice in Nursing

Awards and honours
In 2001 Freshwater was elected Fellow of the Royal College of Nursing (FRCN).

Personal life
Freshwater is a marathon runner and has completed the London Marathon seven times.

References 

1962 births
Living people
Fellows of the Royal College of Nursing
University of Western Australia vice-chancellors
Women heads of universities and colleges
British nurses